Al-Ittihad Sport, Cultural & Social Club famously known as Al-Ittihad Tripoli, or simply Al-Ittihad, is a Libyan football club based in Bab Ben Gashier, Tripoli, Libya. They have won the Libyan Premier League 18 times, the Libyan Cup 7 times and the Libyan SuperCup 10 times.

Al-ittihad reached the quarter-finals of the CAF Confederation Cup in 2010.

History
Al-Ittihad Club was founded on July 29, 1949, after a merger between three  clubs,  "Al Ummal", "Al Nahda" & "Al Shabab". Mohamed Al-Krewi was the founder and first president.

Honours

Libyan Championships

Libyan Premier League: 18

1964–65, 1965–66, 1968–69, 1985–86, 1987–88, 1988–89, 1989–90, 1990–91, 2001–02, 2002–03, 2004–05, 2005–06, 2006–07, 2007–08, 2008–09, 2009–10, 2020–21 , 2021-2022

Libyan Cup: 7

 ,1992, 1999, 2004, 2005, 2007, 2009, 2018
Finalist: 1994, 1987, 2002, 2003

Libyan SuperCup: 10
1999, 2002, 2003 2004 2005 2006 2007 2008 2009 2010

Performance in CAF competitions
CAF Champions League / African Cup of Champions Clubs: 15 appearances
The club have 5 appearances in African Cup of Champions Clubs from 1967 to 1992 and 10 appearances in CAF Champions League from 2003 till now.

1967 – Quarter-finals
1985 – First round
1990 – First round
1991 – First round
1992 – First round

2003 – First round
2004 – Preliminary round
2006 – Preliminary round
2007 – Semi-finals
2008 – Second round

2009 – First round
2010 – Second round
2011 – Second round
2013 – Preliminary round
2021–22 – First round

CAF Confederation Cup: 11 appearances

2005 – Second round
2008 – Play-off round
2010 – Semi-finals
2011 – Play-off round

2015 – First round
2016 – First round
2018 – First round
2018–19 – First round

2019–20 – First round
2020–21 – First round
2021–22 – Quarter-finals

CAF Cup Winners' Cup: 1 appearance
2000 – Semi-finals

Stadium
Alittihad play their home games at the Tripoli Stadium, 6 km from center of Tripoli. They share the 80,000 capacity ground with Al-Ahly Tripoli and Al Madina. The club owns the 5,000 capacity Al Mala'b Al Baladi. Located in central Tripoli, the ground is now used for training.

Current squad

Managers

 Ion Moldovan (1995–96)
 Semen Osynovskyi (Aug 1998 – Nov 1998)
 Giuseppe Dossena (2002–03)
 Ion Moldovan (2005–06)
 Branko Smiljanić (July 2006 – June 8)
 Stefano Cusin (Dec 2008 – June 9)
 Miodrag Ješić (July 2009 – May 10)
 Anwar Salama (May 2010 – Oct 10)
 Baltemar Brito (2010–11)
 Marcos Paquetá (2011–12)
 José Vidigal (2012–13)
 Baltemar Brito (2013–14)
 Osama Al Hamadi (2020–21)
 Giuseppe Sannino (2021)
 Osama Al Hamadi (2021–22)

Other sports
Al Ittihad has got teams competing in different other sports.
Al Ittihad's  Handball, Volleyball and Basketball teams have won many national competitions.

References

External links
 Al-Ittihad Photo Gallery 
 Club Information at Goalzz.com
  www.ittihad4ever.com – Fans Site
  ittihad13
   kooora.com – Libyan soccer forums
 Al Ittihad Photo Gallery @ Flickr 
  History of the Club

Ittihad
Association football clubs established in 1944
Sport in Tripoli, Libya
1944 establishments in Libya